Clément Van Der Straten was a Belgian polo player. He competed in the polo tournament at the 1920 Summer Olympics.

References

External links
 

Year of birth missing
Year of death missing
Belgian polo players
Polo players at the 1920 Summer Olympics
Olympic polo players of Belgium
Place of birth missing